Powerlifting at the 2015 Pacific Games was held from 9–10 July 2015 in the Sir John Guise Indoor Power Dome at Port Moresby, Papua New Guinea. The host nation Papua New Guinea was the dominant team, particularly in the women's divisions where it claimed six of the seven possible gold medals. Nauru was the strongest team in the men's divisions, winning four of the eight weight categories. Telupe Iosefa received the first ever gold medal won by Tuvalu at the Pacific Games in the 120 kg male division.

Medal summary

Medal table

Men

Women

References

2015 Pacific Games
2015